Audiology (from Latin , "to hear"; and from Greek , -logia) is a branch of science that studies hearing, balance, and related disorders. Audiologists treat those with hearing loss and proactively prevent related damage. By employing various testing strategies (e.g. behavioral hearing tests, otoacoustic emission measurements, and electrophysiologic tests), audiologists aim to determine whether someone has normal sensitivity to sounds. If hearing loss is identified, audiologists determine which portions of hearing (high, middle, or low frequencies) are affected, to what degree (severity of loss), and where the lesion causing the hearing loss is found (outer ear, middle ear, inner ear, auditory nerve and/or central nervous system). If an audiologist determines that a hearing loss or vestibular abnormality is present, they will provide recommendations for interventions or rehabilitation (e.g. hearing aids, cochlear implants, appropriate medical referrals).

In addition to diagnosing audiologic and vestibular pathologies, audiologists can also specialize in rehabilitation of tinnitus, hyperacusis, misophonia, auditory processing disorders, cochlear implant use and/or hearing aid use. Audiologists can provide hearing health care from birth to end-of-life.

Audiologist
An audiologist is a health care provider specializing in identifying, diagnosing, treating, and monitoring disorders of the auditory and vestibular systems. Audiologists are trained to diagnose, manage and/or treat hearing, tinnitus, or balance problems. They dispense, manage, and rehabilitate hearing aids and assess candidacy for and map hearing implants, such as cochlear implants, middle ear implants and bone conduction implants. They counsel families through a new diagnosis of hearing loss in infants, and help teach coping and compensation skills to late-deafened adults. They also help design and implement personal and industrial hearing safety programs, newborn hearing screening programs, school hearing screening programs, and provide special or custom fitted ear plugs and other hearing protection devices to help prevent hearing loss. Audiologists are trained to evaluate peripheral vestibular disorders originating from pathologies of the vestibular portion of the inner ear.  They also provide treatment for certain vestibular and balance disorders such as Benign Paroxysmal Positional Vertigo (BPPV).  In addition, many audiologists work as auditory or acoustic scientists in a research capacity.

Audiologists are trained in anatomy and physiology, hearing aids, cochlear implants, electrophysiology, acoustics, psychophysics and psychoacoustics, neurology, vestibular function and assessment, balance disorders, counseling and communication options such as sign language. Audiologists may also run a neonatal hearing screening program which has been made compulsory in many hospitals in US, UK and India.
An audiologist usually graduates with one of the following qualifications: BSc, MSc(Audiology), AuD, STI, PhD, or ScD, depending the program and country attended. In 2018, a report by CareerCast found the occupation of audiologist to be the third least stressful job surveyed.

History
The use of the terms audiology and audiologist in publications has been traced back only as far as 1946. The creator of the term remains unknown, but Berger identified possible originators as Mayer BA Schier, Willard B Hargrave, Stanley Nowak, Norman Canfield, or Raymond Carhart. In a biographical profile by Robert Galambos, Hallowell Davis is credited with coining the term in the 1940s, saying the then-prevalent term "auricular training" sounded like a method of teaching people how to wiggle their ears.  the first US university course for audiologists was offered by Carhart at Northwestern University, in 1946.

Audiology was born of interdisciplinary collaboration. The substantial prevalence of hearing loss observed in the veteran population after World War II inspired the creation of the field as it is known today.  The International Society of Audiology (ISA) was founded in 1952 to "…facilitate the knowledge, protection and rehabilitation of human hearing" and to "…serve as an advocate for the profession and for the hearing impaired throughout the world." It promotes interactions among national societies, associations and organizations that have similar missions, through the organization of a biannual world congresses, through the publication of the scientific peer-reviewed International Journal of Audiology and by offering support to the World Health Organization's efforts towards addressing the needs of the hearing impaired and deaf community.

Requirements

Australia
In Australia Audiologists must hold a Master of Audiology, Master of Clinical Audiology, Master of Audiology Studies or alternatively a bachelor's degree from overseas certified by the private agency Vocational Education, Training and Assessment Services (VETASSESS). Although audiologists in Australia are not required to be a member of any professional body, audiology graduates can undergo a clinical training program or internship leading to accreditation with Audiology Australia (AudA) or the Australian College of Audiology (ACAud) which involves supervised practice and professional development, and typically lasts one year.

To provide rehabilitative services to eligible pensioners, war veterans, and children and young adults under the age of 26 as part of the Hearing Services Program, an audiologist must hold a qualified practitioner (QP) number which can be sought by first obtaining accreditation.

Brazil 
In Brazil, audiology training is part of speech pathology and audiology undergraduate, four-year courses. The University of São Paulo was the first university to offer a bachelor's degree, and it started operations in 1977. At the federal level, the recognition of the educational programs and the profession of speech pathologist and audiologist took place on December 9, 1981, signed by President João Figueiredo (law no. 6965). The  terms  audiology and  audiologist can be tracked in Brazilian publications since 1946.  The work of audiologists in Brazil was described in 2007.

Canada
In Canada, a masters of science (MSc) is the minimum requirement to practice audiology in the country. The profession is regulated in New Brunswick, Quebec, Ontario, Manitoba, Saskatchewan, Alberta, and British Columbia, where it is illegal to practice without being registered as a full member in the appropriate provincial regulatory body.

Bangladesh
A BSc (Hons) in audiology and speech language pathology is required.

India
To practice audiology, professionals need to have either a bachelor's or a master's degree in audiology and be registered with Rehabilitation Council of India (RCI).

Malaysia
Three Malaysian educational institutions offer degrees in audiology.

United Kingdom
There are currently five routes to becoming a registered audiologist:
 FdSc in hearing aid audiology
 BSc in audiology
 MSc in audiology
 Fast-track conversion Diploma for those with a BSc in another relevant science subject, available at Southampton, Manchester, UCL, London, and Edinburgh
 BSc(Hons) in clinical physiology (audiology) available at Glasgow Caledonian University (all applicants must be NHS employees)

United States
In the United States, audiologists are regulated by state licensure or registration in all 50 states and the District of Columbia. Starting in 2007, the doctor of audiology (AuD) became the entry-level degree for clinical practice for some states, with most states expected to follow this requirement very soon, as there are no longer any professional programs in audiology which offer the master's degree. Minimum requirements for the AuD degree include a minimum of 75 semester hours of post-baccalaureate study, meeting prescribed competencies, passing a national exam offered by Praxis Series of the Educational Testing Service, and practicum experience that is equivalent to a minimum of 12 months of full-time, supervised experience. Most states have continuing education renewal requirements that must be met to stay licensed. Audiologists can also earn a certificate from the American Speech-Language-Hearing Association or seek board certification through the American Board of Audiology (ABA). Currently, there are over 70 AuD programs in the United States.

In the past, audiologists have typically held a master's degree and the appropriate healthcare license. However, in the 1990s the profession began to transition to a doctoral level as a minimum requirement. In the United States, starting in 2007, audiologists were required to receive a doctoral degree (AuD or PhD) in audiology from an accredited university graduate or professional program before practicing. All states require licensing, and audiologists may also carry national board certification from the American Board of Audiology or a certificate of clinical competence in audiology (CCC-A) from the American Speech-Language-Hearing Association.

Pakistan 
In Pakistan, a master's or doctoral degree in audiology is required to practice this profession. This medical degree must come from a recognised institute, most of which are government, otherwise the person didn't get the license to practice the audiology. Pakistan Medical and Dental Council (PMDC) issues the practicing license to all the medical students. Besides these, the person who provides the medical instruments to these doctors should also have the certificate of accreditation, issued by the Pakistan National Accreditation Council (PNAC).

Portugal
The exercise of audiologist profession in Portugal necessarily imply the qualifications degree in audiology or legally equivalent as defined in Decree-Law 320/99 of August 11 Article 4.

South Africa
In South Africa, there are currently five institutions offering training in audiology. The institutions offer different qualifications that make one eligible for practicing audiology in South Africa. The qualifications are as follows, I) B. Audiology, II) BSc. Audiology, III) B. Communication Pathology (Audiology), and IV) B. Speech Language Pathology and Audiology (BSLP&A). All practicing audiologists are required to be registered with the Health Professional Council of South Africa (HPCSA).

See also

 Audiology and hearing health professionals in developed and developing countries
 Auditory brainstem response (ABR)
 Auditory agnosia
 Auditory processing disorder
 Auditory verbal agnosia
 Audiometrist
 Audiometry
 Balance disorder
 Bone anchored hearing aid (BAHA)
 Cochlear implant
 Computational audiology
 Dichotic listening test
 Earplug
 Electronystagmography (ENG/VNG)
 European Federation of Audiology Societies
 Hearing Aid
 Hearing impairment
 Listening
 Noise induced hearing loss
 Otoacoustic emissions
 Otolaryngology
 Otology
 Speech and language pathology
 Spatial hearing loss
 Tympanometry

References

External links

 
Otology
Rehabilitation team
Auditory system
Acoustics
Sound

sv:Audionom
th:นักโสตสัมผัสวิทยา